Shahdag may refer to:

 Shahdag Qusar FK
 Shahdag Mountain Resort
 Shahdag Mountain
 Shahdag National Park
 Shahdagh people
 Şahdağ, or Shahdagh, Azerbaijan